Gargiu (also Romanized as Gargīū) is a village in Sarfaryab Rural District, Sarfaryab District, Charam County, Kohgiluyeh and Boyer-Ahmad Province, Iran. At the 2006 census, its population was 207, in 47 families.

References 

Populated places in Charam County